Prestige Flowers is a British internet retailer that specializes in the sale and delivery of fresh and silk floral bouquets.

History 
Prestige Flowers was established by the Simon Crowther and James Miskell in 2011. Prestige Flowers imports flowers from the Netherlands, Africa, Ecuador, and South America and delivers to the customers in UK and around the world.

Charity work 
Prestige Flowers has been supporting the  Barnardo’s since 2012. The company designed a special range of bouquets and donated 25% of overall order cost to the charity.

Prestige Flowers also supports Cancer Research UK and donates one-quarter of each order’s value to the organization. Prestige Flowers designed a special bouquet "Kate’s Bouquet" named for  Kate Guthrie, who died in 1994 from sarcoma. This campaign has raised £549,000 since launch and Prestige Flowers has been part of the campaign.

References 

Online retailers of the United Kingdom
Florist companies